Harold Edwin Brill (March 26, 1914 – September 2, 1980) was an American football tailback. 

A native of Clay Center, Kansas, Brill attended the Norton High School and then played college football at Wichita University.

He then played professional football in the National Football League (NFL) as a tailback for the Detroit Lions. He appeared in two games for the Lions during the 1939 season.

References

1914 births
1980 deaths
People from Clay Center, Kansas
Wichita State Shockers football players
Detroit Lions players
Players of American football from Kansas